In Greek mythology, Telesto or Telestho (Ancient Greek: Τελεστώ means 'success') was an Oceanid, one of the 3,000 water-nymphs daughters of Titans Oceanus and Tethys. She was the personification of the divine blessing or success. Hesiod describes her as "wearing a yellow peplos".

Namesake 
Telesto, a moon of Saturn, discovered in 1980 by Reitsema, Smith, Larson, and Fountain, is named for her.

Notes

Reference 

 Hesiod, Theogony from The Homeric Hymns and Homerica with an English Translation by Hugh G. Evelyn-White, Cambridge, MA.,Harvard University Press; London, William Heinemann Ltd. 1914. Online version at the Perseus Digital Library. Greek text available from the same website.

Oceanids